Sullivan Buses is a bus company based in South Mimms, Hertfordshire, England. Founded in 1998, it operates local bus services in and around Hertfordshire and north London including school services, rail replacement bus services in and near London, bus links in Surrey to and from Thorpe Park and vehicle hire for television programmes.

History

Sullivan Buses was founded in 1998 by former London Underground manager Dean Sullivan.

Sullivan Buses operates public and school bus routes in Hertfordshire and North London. Rail replacement work, particularly on the London Underground, is also operated. In 2004, this work contributed to two-thirds of the company's turnover of £3 million. Sullivan Buses vehicles frequently appear in film and television broadcasts and advertisements, partially because of the company location's proximity to the Elstree Studios. By August 2007, 20 different buses had been used in over 30 productions.

In January 2005, Sullivan Buses purchased Southlands Travel, located at Pollhill in Kent, but this operation ceased in February 2007, with some of the routes passing to Griffin Bus, who operated initially from Pollhill before moving to Longfield. In May 2011 Griffin Bus ceased operations and their routes were transferred over to other operators.

Due to increased traffic congestion, HCC-controlled route B3 was revised with additional running time and made significant changes to timings to meet train arrivals and departures from July 2012. Starting from September 2012, Sullivan Buses won TfL tenders for school routes 628, 653, 683 and 688 from Arriva London North. This came after the company also won the tender for route 298.

Sullivan Buses won the TfL tender on route W9 and retained route 298 in 2016, both acquiring brand-new Alexander Dennis Enviro200 MMC buses as a result.

From 1 September 2018, Sullivan Buses axed a section of commercial route 398 between Watford and Borehamwood. To minimise inconvenience, route 306 improved its evening frequencies to every 15 minutes.

In May 2021, it was announced Sullivan Buses would take over the TfL tender for route 549 from 12 March 2022.

In February 2022, Sullivan Buses announced the takeover of route 84 between Potters Bar and St Albans, following Metroline's decision to withdraw from the route. The effects took place on 2 April 2022.

Depot

South Mimms (SM)
As at November 2020, South Mimms operated London routes 217, 298, 299, 327, 389, 399, 549, 603, 605, 606, 617, 626, 628, 629, 640, 653, 683, 688 and W9. As at December 2021, it also operated 19 other routes either operated under contract to Hertfordshire County Council or commercially.

North Mymms
Sullivan Buses operate a maintenance facility based at North Mymms providing services to all of Sullivan's fleet.

Staines
Sullivan operate a small garage based in Staines to maintain their Thorpe Park fleet.

Fleet
The fleet initially was built up with ex Transport for London Leyland Olympians, Leyland Titans, MCW Metrobuses and Volvo Olympians. As at November 2020, the fleet consisted of 111 buses, including an AEC Routemaster heritage vehicle and a driver training vehicle.

References

External links

Company website

Bus operators in Hertfordshire
Bus operators in Surrey
Companies based in Hertsmere
Transport companies established in 1998
1998 establishments in England